Shagird may refer to:
 Shagird (1967 film), an Indian Hindi-language comedy drama film
 Shagird (2011 film), an Indian Hindi-language action thriller film